Big Two Comics in the American comic book industry refers to the two largest publishers: DC Comics, a subsidiary of Warner Bros. Discovery, known as the publisher of books featuring Superman, Batman, Wonder Woman, The Flash, Green Lantern and Green Arrow; and Marvel Comics, a subsidiary of The Walt Disney Company, known as the publisher of books featuring Spider-Man, the X-Men, the Avengers, the Hulk, Daredevil and the Fantastic Four.

Marvel Comics
DC Comics
Comic book publishing companies of the United States